The Kimfly River is a Slovenian single-place paraglider that was designed in collaboration with Michaël Nessler and was produced by Kimfly of Vodice. It is now out of production.

Design and development
The River was designed as an intermediate glider. The models are each named for their relative size.

Variants
River S
Small model for lighter pilots. The glider model is Slovenian certified.
River SM
Small/medium-sized model for light to medium-weight pilots. The glider model is Slovenian certified.
River M
Medium-sized model for medium-weight pilots. The glider model is Slovenian certified.
River L
Large model for heavy-weight pilots. The glider model is Slovenian certified.
River XL
Extra large model for even heavier-weight pilots. The glider model is Slovenian certified.

Specifications (River M)

See also
Kimfly Alpin

References

River
Paragliders